An entertainer is someone who provides entertainment in various different forms.

Types of entertainers

 Acrobat
 Actor
 Archimime
 Athlete
 Barker
 Beatboxer
 Benshi
 Bouffon
 Circus performer
 Clown
 Club Hostess/Host
 Comedian
 Dancer
 Drag queen
 Drag king
 Emcee
 Filmmaker
 Flag throwing
 Flair bartender
 Flatulist
 Geisha
 Go-go dancer
 Harlequin
 Host
 Illusionist
 Impressionist
 Internet celebrity
 Itinerant poet
 Japanese idol
 Jester
 Kobzar
 Lirnyk
 Magician
 Master of ceremonies
 Mime
 Minstrel
 Monologist
 Musician
 Painter
 Party princess
 Performer
 Photographer
 Podcaster
 Poet
 Pornographic actor
 Promotional model
 Radio personality
 Rapper
 Rhapsode
 Ring girl
 Ringmaster
 Scop
 Shamakhi dancers
 Showgirl
 Showman
 Showrunner
 Singer
 Skomorokh
 Streamer
 Street performer
 Stunt performer
 Theatre practitioner
 TikToker
 TV celebrity
 Vedette
 Writer
 YouTuber

References

Entertainer